The John Stanger House is a house located in Vancouver, Washington in the Jane Weber Evergreen Arboretum and is listed on the National Register of Historic Places. It is considered the oldest private home in Clark county still on its original site  and the second oldest residence in the county.

The home's site was settled circa 1840 by John Stranger, a millwright for the Hudson's Bay Company who came to the area in 1838 and later assisted in the construction of a water-powered gristmill in nearby Mill Creek for Fort Vancouver.

References

See also
 National Register of Historic Places listings in Clark County, Washington

Buildings and structures in Vancouver, Washington
Houses on the National Register of Historic Places in Washington (state)
Houses in Clark County, Washington
National Register of Historic Places in Clark County, Washington